Pat Metheny Group is the first album by the Pat Metheny Group, released in 1978. It features Pat Metheny on guitars, Lyle Mays on piano and synthesizer, Mark Egan on electric bass, and Danny Gottlieb on drums.

Many elements that became defining traits of the band's overall sound were in place on this album, namely Metheny's incorporation of several different guitars and Mays's fusion of electronic and acoustic keyboards to create a fuller, more harmonically sophisticated foundation for the melodies and solos. This is particularly evidenced on the track, "Phase Dance", where Metheny introduces the main melody on an acoustic guitar and then switches to an electric to play one of the improvisational solos, with Mays providing the foundation on keyboards before playing the other solo. "Phase Dance" quickly became a signature song for the Group, most often played in concert as an introductory piece. The track 'Jaco' is a tribute to the bass player Jaco Pastorius.

Track listing

Personnel
 Pat Metheny  – 6-and 12-string electric and acoustic guitars
 Lyle Mays – piano, Oberheim synthesizer, autoharp
 Mark Egan – fretless electric bass
 Danny Gottlieb – drums

Charts
Album – Billboard

References

Pat Metheny albums
1978 albums
ECM Records albums
Albums produced by Manfred Eicher